These are the international rankings of Albania.

Demographics

Population 2016 ranked 137 out of 196 countries
Life expectancy 2016 ranked 37 out of 183 countries

Economy

Education

 Education Index ranked 77 out of 181 countries.
 Programme for International Student Assessment 2015,
 Maths ranked 56 out of 74.
 Sciences ranked 52 out of 74.
 Reading ranked 62 out of 74.
 Literacy rate 2015 ranked 20 out of 190 countries.

Environment

 Yale University: Environmental Sustainability Index 2005, ranked 24 out of 146 countries.
 Environmental Performance Index 2012, 15 of 132 countries.
 Environmental Performance Index 2012 by Trend EPI 2012, 4 of 132 countries.
 South Pacific Applied Geoscience Commission and United Nations Environment Program: Environmental Vulnerability Index, ranked 158 out of 234 countries.

Military

 Institute for Economics and Peace / EIU: Global Peace Index 2016, ranked 54 out of 163 countries

Politics

 Corruption Perceptions Index 2015 ranked 83 out of 167 countries.
 Press Freedom Index 2016 ranked 82 out of 180 countries.
 Freedom of the Press 2009 ranked 50 out of 98 countries.
 Democracy Index 2015 ranked 81 out of 167 countries.

Society

 University of Leicester 2006 Satisfaction with Life Index ranked 157 out of 178
 New Economics Foundation 2009 Happy Planet Index ranked 54 out of 143.
 World Economic Forum: Global Gender Gap Report 2015 ranked 70 out of 140 countries.

Sport

 FIFA World Rankings: highest was 22nd in August 2015.

Tourism

World Tourism Organization: World Tourism rankings 2008, not ranked among top 50
World Economic Forum: Travel and Tourism Competitiveness Report 2009, ranked 90 out of 133 countries

Technology

List of countries by number of Internet users 2011, ranked 99 out of 193 countries.

References

Albania